Fatyanovo is a rural locality (a village) in Zaborskoye Rural Settlement, Tarnogsky District, Vologda Oblast, Russia. The population was 61 as of 2002.

Geography 
Fatyanovo is located 24 km west of Tarnogsky Gorodok (the district's administrative centre) by road. Krasnoye is the nearest rural locality.

References 

Rural localities in Tarnogsky District